Kebbe is a Local Government Area in Sokoto State, Nigeria. Its headquarters are in the town of Kebbe. The LGA shares a border with Zamfara State in the east and Kebbi State in the south and west.

The postal code of the area is 850.

References

External links
 Map of Kebbe, Nigeria
 Nigerian Congress information on Kebbe

Local Government Areas in Sokoto State